Elías Cuesta Cobo (born 15 March 1985) is a Spanish archer. He competed in the individual event at the 2012 Summer Olympics. He is currently the coach of the Spanish national team.

He is the brother of Irene Cuesta, a Spanish national archery champion and the coach of the Spanish archery team at the 2012 Summer Paralympics.

References 

Spanish male archers
1985 births
Living people
Archers at the 2012 Summer Olympics
Olympic archers of Spain
Sportspeople from Granada
Mediterranean Games silver medalists for Spain
Competitors at the 2013 Mediterranean Games
Mediterranean Games medalists in archery
20th-century Spanish people
21st-century Spanish people